Leo Goodwin may refer to:

Leo Goodwin Sr. (1886–1971), founder of GEICO
Leo Goodwin Jr. (died 1978), businessman
Leo Goodwin (swimmer) (1883–1957), American swimmer and gold medalist